Carlos LeMont Hopkins (born February 27, 1971) is an American attorney and National Guard soldier. Previously serving as counsel to Virginia Governor Terry McAuliffe, he was selected to serve as Virginia Secretary of Veterans and Defense Affairs following the departure of John C. Harvey Jr. in 2017, and was retained in that post when Ralph Northam took office as Governor in January 2018.

Born and raised in Columbia, South Carolina, Hopkins graduated in 1993 from The Citadel, The Military College of South Carolina with a degree in political science. He then attended the University of Richmond School of Law and worked in private practice and as deputy city attorney for Richmond, Virginia.

References

External links
Virginia Secretary of Veterans and Defense Affairs

1971 births
Living people
State cabinet secretaries of Virginia
Virginia Democrats
The Citadel, The Military College of South Carolina alumni
University of Richmond School of Law alumni
People from Columbia, South Carolina
People from Henrico County, Virginia
African-American people in Virginia politics
African-American state cabinet secretaries
21st-century African-American people
20th-century African-American people